Cholevas is a Greek surname. It is also commonly pronounced as Choleva.                             Notable people with the surname include:

José Cholevas (born 1984), Greek professional footballer
Themis Cholevas (1926-2007), Greek former professional basketball player

Greek-language surnames
Surnames
Surnames of Greek origin